Gleđević, less commonly spelled Gledjević was a Ragusan family hailing from Trebinje. They had possessions in modern Berkovići, in southern Bosnia and Herzegovina, where the toponym Gleđevići has survived. They originally were a brootherhood of the Burmazi tribe, however since the late 14th century they formed their own branch and gradually became one of the urban families of Ragusa with estates around Trebinje.

Antun Gleđević (1669-1728), Ragusan poet, known misogynist
Rade Gleđević, Ragusan merchant
Obrad Gleđević (1427-1435), katunar
Radosav Gleđević (1434), katunar
Marin Gleđević

See also
Gleđ

References

Croatian surnames
Serbian surnames